Andrea Esposito (born 17 May 1986) is an Italian footballer who plays as a defender for  club Latina.

Club career
As a young boy, Esposito started his career in the local Lecce Primavera youth squad before being sent to Sambenedettese on loan for the 2006–07 season. He also played five Serie A games before he left on loan, the first of which was on 25 January 2004, against Lazio.

After returning to the Lecce side in 2007, he scored his first professional goal in a 3–2 win over Rimini and helped the club win promotion from Serie B. In the following season in Serie A he scored a goal in a 1–1 home draw against A.C. Milan and impressed enough to force his way into the senior Italy squad at the end of the 2008–09 Serie A season.

In July 2009, he was signed by Genoa in co-ownership deal. On 19 January 2010 Livorno signed the defender on loan from Genoa until June 2010.

He rejoined Lecce for the 2012–13 Lega Pro Prima Divisione season after the club's relegation from Serie A in 2011–12 and subsequent expulsion from the Serie B for their part in the Calcio Scommesse scandal.

On 4 September 2018, following the bankruptcy of Cesena, he signed with the Serie C club Catania.

International career
Esposito has represented Italy at Under-17 level. Despite being uncapped for the Under-21 side, he was named in Pierluigi Casiraghi's preliminary squad for the 2009 Under-21 European Championships but did not make the final 23.

He was called up to the senior Italy squad for the first time in June 2009 and was an unused substitute for the friendly against Northern Ireland.

Career statistics

References

External links
 Player Profile at bolognafc.it
 Player Profile at tuttocalciatori.net

1986 births
Living people
Sportspeople from the Province of Lecce
Footballers from Apulia
Italian footballers
Association football defenders
Serie A players
Serie B players
Serie C players
U.S. Lecce players
A.S. Sambenedettese players
Genoa C.F.C. players
U.S. Livorno 1915 players
Bologna F.C. 1909 players
Latina Calcio 1932 players
L.R. Vicenza players
A.C. Cesena players
Catania S.S.D. players
Italy youth international footballers
21st-century Italian people